Shahzada, Shahzade, Shahozada, Shahzadeh or Shahzadah may refer to:

Persons
 Shahzada (title), princely title, crown prince, the son of a shah, of the Iranian royal house
 Şehzade, as used in the Ottoman Empire
 Haji Shahzada (Guantanamo Bay detainee 952) (born 1959), one of the Guantanamo captives whose 2004 CSR Tribunal determined he was not an enemy after all
 Mullah Shahzada (Taliban commander), Taliban commander, reported to have talked his way out of Guantanamo in May 2003, only to return to the battlefield

Surname
Laila Shahzada (1926–1994), Pakistani abstract painter
Mohammad Shahzada (born 1986), Bangladeshi cricketer

Others
 Shahzada (horse race), an annual endurance race held in Australia
 SS Shahzada, a number of British freighters
 Shahzada (1955 film), a Hindi film of 1955
 Shehzada, a 1972 Hindi-language film
 Shehzada (2023 film), a Hindi-language period comedy film

See also
Shahzoda, an Uzbek singer